The Miss Black USA Scholarship Pageant is a national scholarship competition for young women of African descent that was founded in 1986 by Karen Arrington. While Ms. Arrington has a long-standing history of hosting a national Miss Black USA Scholarship Pageant, her system has not been exclusive in doing so consecutively. As indicated by the chart below, there have been some years where "no pageant was held" by Ms. Arrington's State of Maryland organized non-profit, for example in years such as  1998, 1999 and 2000.  However, similar to Miss USA and Miss America both being national systems, there have been other non-profits to host national scholarship pageants to celebrate Black women, with documented queens.

The Miss Black USA Pageant System founded by Ms. Arrington is a non-profit corporation in the state of Maryland, recognized under the 501(c)3 code of the Internal Revenue Service.  The current titleholder under her pageant system is Tahira Gilyard of New York, who was crowned on August 7, 2022.

History and former titleholders
The first titleholder was Tamiko Gibson, representing Maryland, who was crowned Miss Black USA 1987 at the JW Marriot in Washington, D.C. on June 6, 1987. Gibson would later complain that she had been improperly dethroned in May 1988 and received none of the promised prizes.

On August 23, 2003, Elizabeth Muto won the pageant, which was held in Miami. Muto returned her crown later that year because she was unhappy with the contract that the pageant asked her to sign, which would have made them her exclusive publicist, agent and manager.

State pageants
Each year, state competitions are held across the nation including Alabama, Arizona, California, Colorado, Florida, Georgia, Iowa, Massachusetts,  Mississippi, New York, North Carolina, Ohio, Oregon, South Carolina, Tennessee, Virginia and Washington.  The Miss Black USA organization licenses the state pageants. Women from areas where a state pageant is not held may apply as a delegate-at-large.

Winners

Local and State winners 
Miss Black USA state and local delegate winners and contestants have gone on to successful careers in entertainment, law, education, medicine and other arenas.  Some of the state and local pageant's winners include:
Rev. Deidra Avery, MDiv. (Miss Black Ohio 1993) — Minister of the Gospel of Jesus Christ. 
Kia Talein Anderson (Miss Black Maryland 1992 Miss Black USA First Runner-up 1993) — Award-Winning R&B/Gospel Recording artist, radio and TV Personality, actress and model.
 Dr. Lynette Danley-Land (Miss Black Iowa USA 1995) — College professor, author and speaker.
 Valorie Burton (Former Miss Black Texas USA 1995) — Former co-host of Bishop TD Jake's Potter House, life coach and author.
 Kemba Cofield (Miss Black Kentucky USA 1996) — Jazz recording artist
 Arnecia (Bradley) Williams (Miss Black Alabama USA 2007) — US Army Engineer, Actress, and Motivational Speaker
Chloe Johnson  (Miss Black Colorado USA 2011)  — Television personality, model and dancer.
Kade Henderson (Miss Black New York USA 2015, Community Ambassador Award Recipient) Brand and Wardrobe Stylist and Digital Merchant
Ashley Jones (Miss Black Michigan USA 2015, Top 15 Miss Black USA 2015 national pageant and Community Ambassador Award Recipient) actress, model, brand ambassador, host www.theashleymarie.com
Melba M. Furlow (Miss Black Florida USA 1996)  — Former Christian Radio Talk show host, author, college professor, & former student of Iyanla Vanzanthttp://www.floridafamilynetwork.com/melba-furlow-herringtonhttp://www.jaxpubliclibrary.org/sites/default/files/Biography-Vertical-Files-List-Dec2014.pdf
Daphne Marcelle Lee (Miss Black New Jersey USA 2017) Professional Ballerina, Activist, Model,  Brown Girls Do Ballet, MFA Hollins University, BFA Ailey/Fordham University, www.daphnemlee.com
Yasha Clark (Miss Black Louisiana USA 2019) Personal Injury Attorney, Model, Author www.justcallyasha.com

References

USA
1986 establishments in the United States
Miss Black USA Pageant